Kela, abbr. from ,  (Fpa),  (SII), is a Finnish government agency in charge of settling benefits under national social security programs. Kela was founded in 1937 to handle retirement pay. In the 1980s and 1990s, its role was expanded to handle other fields like child benefits, unemployment benefits, sickness benefits, health insurance and student financial aid.

Kela benefits are funded from three national insurance funds administered by national government: the national pension fund, the national health insurance fund, and the general social security fund. The tax authority (Vero) collects contributions to these funds from general taxation on income, charged to both employers and employees. Rates for 2021 are available on the Vero web site.  Coverage under the schemes is given to all permanent residents of Finland. Kansaneläkelaitos/Folkpensionsanstalten literally means "People's Pension Institute", reflecting its original function as the national provider of retirement benefits.

History 
Kela was founded in 1937 during the first SDP-Agrarian coalition under Aimo Kaarlo Cajander as a means to relieve societal inequality and instability by providing a social safety net organisation.

Directors general

Incidents 
In May 2008, a Kela e-service apparently disclosed confidential medical insurance information to the wrong client, and subsequently Kela took that service offline.

References

External links

Medical and health organisations based in Finland
Social security in Finland
Unemployment benefits